James Bailey (born 13 May 1991) is an English international field hockey player who played as a goalkeeper for England and Great Britain.
Bailey made his international debut on 6 June 2013.

He plays club hockey in the Men's England Hockey League Premier Division for Wimbledon.

He has also played for Old Loughtonians, Team Bath Buccaneers and Reading.

References

1991 births
Living people
English male field hockey players
Wimbledon Hockey Club players
Reading Hockey Club players
Men's England Hockey League players
Team Bath Buccaneers Hockey Club players
2014 Men's Hockey World Cup players